Remember the Day is a 1941 film released by 20th Century Fox, directed by Henry King, and starring Claudette Colbert and John Payne.

Plot
Elderly schoolteacher Nora Trinell reflects on her life and teaching career while waiting to see Dewey Roberts, formerly her student and currently a presidential nominee. This film is reminiscent of Cheers for Miss Bishop (1941) and Good Morning, Miss Dove (1955).

Cast
Claudette Colbert as Nora Trinell
John Payne as Dan Hopkins
Shepperd Strudwick as Dewey Roberts (as John Sheppard)
Ann E. Todd as Kate Hill Roberts
Douglas Croft as Dewey Roberts as a boy
Anne Revere as Miss Price
Frieda Inescort as Mrs. Roberts
Harry Hayden as Mr. Roberts
Francis Pierlot as Mr. Steele
Marie Blake as Miss Cartwright
Chick Chandler as Mr. Mason
Selmer Jackson as Graham

References

External links

 
 

1941 films
1941 drama films
20th Century Fox films
American drama films
American black-and-white films
Films about educators
Films directed by Henry King
Films scored by David Raksin
Films set in Indiana
Films set in the 1910s
Films set in the 1920s
Films set in the 1930s
Films set in the 1940s
Films produced by William Perlberg
1940s English-language films
1940s American films